Al-Arbiyin is a sub-district located in al-Sayyani District, Ibb Governorate, Yemen. Al-Arbiyin had a population of 8684 according to the 2004 census.

References 

Sub-districts in As Sayyani District